The Jardin botanique de la Charme (18,000 m²), formerly known as the Jardin botanique de la Ville de Clermont-Ferrand, is a municipal botanical garden located at 10, rue de la Charme, Clermont-Ferrand, Puy-de-Dôme, Auvergne, France. It is open weekdays year-round plus weekends in the warmer months; admission is free.

The city's first botanical garden was established in 1781 by Abbé Antoine Delarbre on a rented site, now the Jardin Lecoq, and moved multiple times throughout the centuries.

Today's garden was created in 1974 and currently contains about 2600 plant species arranged in a variety of collections including a systematic collection arranged by botanical family (1600 species), a collection of trees and ornamental shrubs, perennials, shade garden with ferns, pond and bog plants, medicinal and useful plants (500 plants), a collection of fruit species, test garden for conifers, and a greenhouse. It also contains a seed collection of 2000 samples.

See also 
 List of botanical gardens in France

References 
 Jardin botanique de la Charme 
 Jardin botanique de la Charme: Historique (French)
 Parcs et Jardins entry (French)
 Gralon entry (French)
 Jardins du Massif Central entry (French) 
 Culture.fr entry (French) 
 Paul Émile Girod, Le jardin botanique de Clermont et les botanistes de l'Auvergne, Clermont-Ferrand : G. Mont-Louis, 1893.

Charme, Jardin botanique de la
Charme, Jardin botanique de la
Clermont-Ferrand